Aptunga macropasa is a species of snout moth. It was described by Harrison Gray Dyar Jr. in 1919. It is found in Guatemala and Mexico.

References

Moths described in 1919
Phycitinae
Moths of Central America